Man of Many Minds is a science fiction novel by American writer E. Everett Evans. It was first published in 1953 by Fantasy Press in an edition of 3,558 copies.  The book includes an introduction by E. E. Smith.

Plot introduction
The novel concerns the adventures of George Hanlon, a secret service agent who has the ability to read minds.

Reception
P. Schuyler Miller gave the novel a negative review, saying "it won't stand up" against then-contemporary standards, though it might have been successful years earlier.

References

Sources

External links

 

1953 American novels
1953 science fiction novels
American science fiction novels
Novels about telepathy
Fantasy Press books